The Reuben Sweet House, located at 6 Chicago Ave. in Yakima, Washington, United States, was built in 1910 and is listed on the National Register of Historic Places.

External links
 Photo of the Reuben Sweet House
 National Register of Historic Places listings in Yakima County, Washington

References 

Buildings and structures in Yakima, Washington
Houses completed in 1910
Houses in Yakima County, Washington
Houses on the National Register of Historic Places in Washington (state)
National Register of Historic Places in Yakima County, Washington